Hokejski klub mlade kategorije Bled, commonly referred to as HKMK Bled or simply Bled, is an ice hockey club from Bled, Slovenia. The club was founded in 1999. As of 2022–23, they compete only with youth selections.

References

External links
Official website 
Hokej.si profile 
Eurohockey profile

Ice hockey clubs established in 1999
Ice hockey teams in Slovenia
Sport in Bled
1999 establishments in Slovenia
Slovenian Ice Hockey League teams
Inter-National League teams
Slohokej League teams
Interliga (1999–2007) teams
Alpenliga teams